The following events occurred in December 1926:

Wednesday, December 1, 1926
The legislature of Ontario voted to strike down the Ontario Temperance Act in the province after a decade of enforcement. The repeal was to go into effect in February 1927. This left the Maritime provinces as the only region in Canada to have Prohibition laws.
Charlie Chaplin was left by his second wife, Lita Grey, after two years of marriage. They officially divorced in August 1927.
Born: Allyn Ann McLerie, actress, singer and dancer, in Grand-Mère, Quebec (d. 2018); and Robert Symonds, actor, in Bristow, Oklahoma (d. 2007)

Thursday, December 2, 1926
At a conference in Tianjin, the northern warlords of China formed an alliance to fight the Kuomintang. Zhang Zuolin was elected commander of the army to be known as the Ankuochun.
British Prime Minister Stanley Baldwin ended the martial law that had been in effect since the general strike.

Friday, December 3, 1926
British mystery writer Agatha Christie disappeared from her home in Shere, Surrey. Her car was found abandoned several miles away with her clothes and identification inside strewn about inside, but there were no signs of foul play.

Mickey Walker won boxing's World Middleweight Title, defeating Tiger Flowers at the Chicago Coliseum.
Died: Charles Edward Ringling, 63, one of the Ringling brothers circus owners

Saturday, December 4, 1926
The 14th Grey Cup of Canadian football was played at Varsity Stadium in Toronto; the Senators defeated the Toronto Varsity Blues, 10–7.
Queen Marie of Romania arrived back in Bucharest after two months away; King Ferdinand was well enough to greet her at the train station.
Died: Ivana Kobilca, 64, Slovenian painter

Sunday, December 5, 1926
George Hassell murdered his wife and eight children in Farwell, Texas.
The Sergei Eisenstein film Battleship Potemkin played in the United States for the first time, in New York City only.
Died: Claude Monet, 86, French Impressionist painter

Monday, December 6, 1926
The Forty-Third Council Session of the League of Nations began in Geneva. The primary matter of discussion was the Military Inter-Allied Commission of Control, which Germany was negotiating to have abandoned.
Benito Mussolini decreed a bachelor tax in Italy, effective January 1, on all unmarried men. The tax was progressive by income and sought to increase the country's birth rates.

Tuesday, December 7, 1926
U.S. President Calvin Coolidge made his fourth State of the Union address to Congress. "In reporting to the Congress the state of the Union, I find it impossible to characterize it other than one of general peace and prosperity", he began. One of the items he called for was new legislation of the radio, which led to the Radio Act of 1927. Coolidge also reminded listeners that Prohibition was "the law of the land" and urged its enforcement, saying, "Some people do not like the amendment, some do not like other parts of the Constitution, some do not like any of it. Those who entertain such sentiments have a perfect right to seek through legal methods for a change. But for any of our inhabitants to observe such parts of the Constitution as they like, while disregarding others, is a doctrine that would break down all protection of life and property and destroy the American system of ordered liberty."
Carmi Thompson, leader of a commission to survey the condition of the Philippines, recommended the postponement of independence.
The Council for the Preservation of Rural England (CPRE, now the Campaign to Protect Rural England) was founded.

Wednesday, December 8, 1926
The Calles government of Mexico recognized the Nicaraguan rebel government of Juan Bautista Sacasa and not President Adolfo Díaz as the legitimate government of Nicaragua, putting it at odds with the United States.

Thursday, December 9, 1926
In Britain, coal restrictions in force during the labour dispute were lifted.

Benny Goodman and Glenn Miller made their recording debuts as members of Ben Pollack's orchestra, when it cut the jazz-dance numbers "When I First Met Mary" and "Deed I Do" for the Victor label.
Born: Henry Way Kendall, physicist and Nobel Prize laureate, in Boston, Massachusetts (d. 1999); and Lorenzo Wright, American athlete, in Detroit (d. 1972)

Friday, December 10, 1926
The Nobel Prizes for 1926 were awarded in Oslo. The honourees consisted of Jean Baptiste Perrin (award for Physics), Theodor Svedberg (Chemistry), Johannes Fibiger (Physiology or Medicine) and Grazia Deledda (Literature). The Peace Prize was given to multiple recipients: Aristide Briand of France, Gustav Stresemann of Germany and Austen Chamberlain of the United Kingdom were recognized for their roles in the Locarno Treaties, and Charles G. Dawes of the United States for the Dawes Plan. Chamberlain and Dawes were named retroactively for 1925 as no Peace Prize recipients were named that year.   
Died: Nikola Pašić, 80, former Prime Minister of Serbia and Yugoslavia

Saturday, December 11, 1926
The League of Nations adjourned after adopting a protocol that would terminate the Military Inter-Allied Commission of Control.

Adolf Hitler published Volume 2 of his autobiographical manifesto Mein Kampf.
Born: Big Mama Thornton, American rhythm and blues singer, in Ariton, Alabama (d. 1984)

Sunday, December 12, 1926

The Italian Socialist Filippo Turati completed a dramatic overnight journey by motorboat to Corsica, escaping the Fascists who had restricted his movements under the country's new confinement laws. Turati's escape to France was aided by Carlo Rosselli, Ferruccio Parri and future Italian President Sandro Pertini.  
Irvington, New Jersey, invoked the state's blue law from 1854 to arrest 95 people for doing business on the Sabbath. An organization of ten local ministers was behind the push for enforcement.

Monday, December 13, 1926
Väinö Tanner took office as the Prime Minister of Finland.
Miina Sillanpää became Finland's first female government minister.
Born: George Rhoden, athlete, in Kingston, Jamaica (alive in 2021)

Tuesday, December 14, 1926

Agatha Christie, missing for 11 days, was found at a spa in Harrogate. Her husband Archie issued a statement claiming she had been suffering from amnesia.
A specially prepared phonograph record was played over WGN radio in Chicago, in which Benito Mussolini addressed the American people in the first recording ever made of his voice. The nine-minute address was in Italian and then announcer Bill Hay read an English translation after the recording was finished. Mussolini stated that he felt "the heartiest friendship" for the United States, that he was a "sincere admirer" of American civilization, and that Italian-Americans were "a complete example of the fusion of the two civilizations, a wonderful and profitable treaty of union. So is built an indissoluble relation of cordiality, friendship, and collaboration. The two lands will, I am convinced, travel a long road together."

Wednesday, December 15, 1926
Roman Catholic clergy in the United States issued a collective pastoral letter condemning the ongoing persecution of Catholics in Mexico.

Thursday, December 16, 1926
In the Reichstag, Philipp Scheidemann of the Social Democratic Party of Germany accused Chancellor Wilhelm Marx of building up a secret army in Germany with arms imported from Russia to restore the Kaiser.
Born: James McCracken, operatic tenor, in Gary, Indiana (d. 1988)
Died: William Larned, 53, American tennis champion

Friday, December 17, 1926

The 1926 Lithuanian coup d'état occurred, overthrowing President Kazys Grinius and installing Antanas Smetona.
The Wilhelm Marx government fell in the Reichstag on a motion of no confidence. The decision on who should form the next government was put off until January as the Reichstag adjourned for Christmas vacation.
The First All-Union Census of the Soviet Union was conducted.
Born: Allan V. Cox, geologist, in Santa Ana, California (d. 1987); and Bill Keightley, basketball equipment manager, in Lawrenceburg, Kentucky (d. 2008) 
Died: Lars Magnus Ericsson, 80, Swedish inventor and founder of Ericsson

Saturday, December 18, 1926
The Kuomintang captured Fuzhou.
The Sherlock Holmes short story "The Adventure of the Retired Colourman" by Sir Arthur Conan Doyle was published for the first time in Liberty magazine in the United States.

Sunday, December 19, 1926
The Condé diamond, stolen in October, was recovered in Paris when a hotel chambermaid bit into an apple left in the room and found it contained the stolen gem. She took it to authorities and several arrests were made.

Monday, December 20, 1926
The St. Louis Cardinals traded star player Rogers Hornsby to the New York Giants for Frankie Frisch and Jimmy Ring. St. Louis fans were so angered by the trade that Mayor Victor J. Miller tried unsuccessfully to get it overturned, but hindsight would show that the trade went well for the Cardinals.  
Born: Geoffrey Howe, politician, in Port Talbot, Wales (d. 2015); and David Levine, illustrator, in Brooklyn, New York (d. 2009)

Tuesday, December 21, 1926
Baseball commissioner Kenesaw Mountain Landis released the findings of a three-month investigation into allegations made by Dutch Leonard that Ty Cobb, Tris Speaker and Smoky Joe Wood had conspired to fix a game in 1919. The evidence included letters from Cobb and Wood describing the plot and details on betting, as well as testimony in which they admitted to writing the letters but denied betting on the game.
Oswald Mosley of the Labour Party won the Smethwick by-election.
Born: Champ Butler, singer, in St. Louis, Missouri (d. 1992); Joe Paterno, college football player and coach, in Brooklyn, New York (d. 2012)

Wednesday, December 22, 1926
The government of Romania introduced a bill that would make it a crime for anyone to send out news offending the King, Queen or Crown Prince. The punishment would be four years in prison and a $100 fine.
Born: Alcides Ghiggia, footballer, in Montevideo (d. 2015)

Thursday, December 23, 1926
Nicaraguan President Adolfo Díaz requested U.S. military assistance in the ongoing civil war. American peacekeeping troops immediately set up neutral zones in Puerto Cabezas and at the mouth of the Rio Grande to protect American and foreign lives and property.
The film Tell It to the Marines, starring Lon Chaney, premiered in New York.
Born: Robert Bly, poet, author and activist, in Lac qui Parle County, Minnesota (2021)

Friday, December 24, 1926
Nicaraguan President Adolfo Díaz survived an assassination attempt when two men charged at him with machetes as he was entering his cab.
Died: Johan Castberg, 64, Norwegian Radical politician

Saturday, December 25, 1926
Japan was plunged into mourning at the news of the death of Emperor Taishō. Hirohito became the new Emperor.
The film Flesh and the Devil, starring Greta Garbo and John Gilbert, was released.
Died: Emperor Taishō, 47, Emperor of Japan

Sunday, December 26, 1926
More than 2,000 residents of Nashville, Tennessee, were driven from their homes due to flooding from the Cumberland River. 
In the history of Japan, the Shōwa period began.
Born: Gina Pellón, painter, in Cumanayagua, Cuba (d. 2014)

Monday, December 27, 1926

Imperial Airways announced the first scheduled air service from Britain to India starting January 1.
Proctor's Theatre opened in Schenectady, New York.

Tuesday, December 28, 1926
Emperor Hirohito and Empress Kōjun held their first levée. Hirohito read a script outlining his policies of what was to be sought, among them "national harmony in purpose and action" and "beneficience to all classes of people and friendship for all nations on earth."
In Melbourne, Australia, Victoria scored a First-class cricket record 1,107 runs against New South Wales.
Korean nationalist Na Seok-ju attacked the Oriental Development Company Building, a symbol of Imperial Japan's colonialism, in Seoul. He killed several Japanese office workers and a police officer with grenades and bullets before fatally shooting himself as police were closing in. He was later hailed for his actions as a national hero.
Died: Robert William Felkin, 73, British writer; Na Seok-ju, 33 or 34, Korean nationalist

Wednesday, December 29, 1926
District Attorney Asa Keyes announced that the Aimee Semple McPherson trial would not go forward and that the charges against her of faking her kidnapping story would be dropped. "Dismissal of charges is necessary because of the impossibility of conviction in the present state of the case", Keyes stated.
Died: Rainer Maria Rilke, 51, Austrian poet

Thursday, December 30, 1926
Government troops of Nicaraguan President Adolfo Díaz were routed at Pearl Lagoon by the rebel forces of Juan Bautista Sacasa.

Friday, December 31, 1926
Turkey, the last nation in the world to use the old Julian calendar, marked the day as "December 18, 1926", then switched over at midnight to the Gregorian calendar as part of the reforms set by Mustafa Kemal Atatürk.  At 12:01 am, the official date in Turkey was "January 1, 1927".
As a New Year's gift, King Alfonso XIII of Spain either granted pardons or commuted the sentences of all the artillery officers involved in the protests of the previous September.
The Académie française voted in the affirmative, by a count of eight to five, on the question of whether animals have souls. 
The Buster Keaton comedy film The General was released.
Born: 
Billy Snedden, politician, in Perth, Australia (d. 1987)

References

1926
1926-12
1926-12